Dan A. Black (born February 18, 1955) is an American economist and professor at the University of Chicago Harris School of Public Policy, where he is also the deputy dean and director of Ph.D. programs. He is also the project director of the National Longitudinal Survey of Youth and a senior fellow at the National Opinion Research Center. Before joining the faculty of the University of Chicago, he taught at the University of Kentucky and Syracuse University.

References

External links

1955 births
21st-century American economists
Labor economists
University of Chicago faculty
University of Kansas alumni
Purdue University alumni
University of Kentucky faculty
Syracuse University faculty
Living people